The 1991 Jacksonville State Gamecocks football team represented Jacksonville State University as a member of the Gulf South Conference (GSC) during the 1991 NCAA Division II football season. Led by seventh-year head coach Bill Burgess, the Gamecocks compiled an overall record of 12–1 with a mark of 6–0 in conference play, winning the GSC title.

Schedule

References

Jacksonville State
Jacksonville State Gamecocks football seasons
Gulf South Conference football champion seasons
Jacksonville State Gamecocks football